General elections were held in Niue on 30 May 2020 for the 20 members of the Niue Assembly. The election resulted in the defeat of Premier Toke Talagi, who lost his seat. Fifteen incumbents were re-elected, including three who were unopposed. In Mutalu, a tie between two candidates resulted in one being elected by a coin toss.

Following the elections the Assembly elected Dalton Tagelagi as Premier.

Electoral system
The 20 members of the Assembly are elected by two methods; 14 are elected from single-member consistencies using first-past-the-post voting and six are elected from a single nationwide constituency by multiple non-transferable vote.  There are currently no political parties. After the election, the Members of the Assembly elect a Speaker of the Assembly from outside parliament, and a Premier, who must be an MP. The Premier then chooses a Cabinet.

Campaign
A total of 54 candidates contested the elections, of which 26 contested the six common roll seats. All twenty incumbents sought re-election. Three candidates – Mona Ainuu in Tuapa, Enetama Lipitoa in Namukulu and Talaititama Talaiti in Vaiea – were elected unopposed. One of the candidates was former New Zealand MP and mayor of Wellington Mark Blumsky, who had become a naturalised Niuean citizen after ten years' residence.

Results
The Premier Toke Talagi, in office for the previous twelve years, lost his seat, finishing tenth in the six-seat common roll constituency. Five of the elected members were new to the Assembly. After a draw in Mutalau, the result was decided by a coin toss.

The results of the election reduced the number of women in the Assembly dropped from 5 to 3, with only one women in cabinet, Mona Ainuu.

In a secret ballot, the Assembly elected Dalton Tagelagi as Premier in a 13-7 vote against O'Love Jacobsen, and Hima Douglas was elected Speaker on the third ballot. The new Cabinet was announced on June 11.

Common roll

By constituency

References

2020 elections in Oceania
General election
2020
May 2020 events in Oceania
Non-partisan elections